Mao is the romanization of several Chinese family names, including common names 毛 (Máo), 茅 (Máo) and some rare names 茆 (Máo), 卯 (Mǎo), 貌 (Mào) etc.

毛 originated from Ji, the clan name of Zhou Dynasty. 毛 is the 106th surname in the Hundred Family Surnames, and ranks 87th largest number of people with this surname in China (2007).

茅 is the 119th surname in Hundred Family Surnames.

Notable people surnamed Mao

毛

Mao Chaofeng, politician born in 1965
Mao Chi-kuo (b. 1948), a Republic of China politician
Mao Jie (d. 216), a minister to Cao Cao
Mao Sidi, pseudonym of Steven W. Mosher (born 1948), American social scientist and author
Mao Wenlong (1576-1629), a commander of the Ming Dynasty
Mao Zedong, (1893-1976), the founder of the People's Republic of China and chairman of the Chinese Communist Party
Madame Mao (Jiang Qing) (1914-1991), the fourth wife of Mao Zedong and a leading politician in the Cultural Revolution
Mao Zemin, (1896-1943), early Communist revolutionary, Mao Zedong's brother
Mao Zetan (1905-1935), brother of Mao Zedong
Mao Anying (1922-1950), the son of Mao Zedong
Mao Yuanxin (b. 1941), nephew of Mao Zedong
Mao Xinyu, (born 1970), grandson of Mao
Mao Zehong (1905-1929), the sister of Mao Zedong
Mao Xiaobing (b. 1965), former party chief of Xining, investigated for corruption
Mao Xiaoping (b. 1957), former mayor of Wuxi
Mao Xinyuan (b 1971), a Chinese race walker
Empress Mao (d. 237), Empress of Cao Wei during the Three Kingdoms era
Teresa Mo (b. 1958), Hong Kong actress
Mao WeiJia, singer
Mao Yingchu, (1910-2000), an ace-fighter pilot during the War of Resistance/WWII; former commander of the 4th Fighter Group

茅
:zh:茅姓 :zh:Category:茅姓
Angela Mao (b. 1950), Taiwanese actress
Mao Dun (1896-1981), pen name of a Chinese writer
Mao Yisheng (1896-1989), a Chinese structural engineer.
Mao Yushi (b. 1929), a Chinese economist, nephew of Mao Yisheng, critic of Mao Zedong.

See also
Mao (given name), a feminine Japanese given name
Mow (surname)

References

Chinese-language surnames

Multiple Chinese surnames